The Big Muddy Badlands are a series of badlands in southern Saskatchewan and northern Montana in the Big Muddy Valley and along Big Muddy Creek.

The Big Muddy Valley and Big Muddy Badlands were formed over 12,000 years ago near the end of the last ice age when a glacial lake outburst flood occurred from a pre-historic glacial lake located at present-day Old Wives Lake. Big Muddy Lake is a large salt lake at the heart of the badlands. Two other notable lakes, Willow Bunch Lake and Lake of the Rivers are farther upstream in the valley.

A prominent feature of the badlands is  Castle Butte, which is an outcrop of sandstone and compressed clay that protrudes above the flat prairie.

Jean Louis Legare Regional Park is a campground and golf course near Willow Bunch at the northern end of the valley.

Ranching and tourism are important industries in the sparsely populated area.

Important Bird Areas of Canada 
Within the Big Muddy Valley and Badlands are four Important Bird Areas of Canada covering five salt lakes and almost  of habitat. All four sites are important for the nationally endangered piping plover.

Alkali Lake SK 016 at only  is the smallest IBA in the valley. The IBA is located at the eastern edge of the Big Muddy Badlands and encompasses the small Alkali Lake that straddles the border with Montana. Alkali Lake is known as Salt Lake on the Montana side of the border.
West Coteau Lake has one dam and East Coteau Lake has four dams, all of which are used to control water levels. The East Coteau Lake has a sodium sulphate mine on its shore at Sybouts.
It encompasses most of Big Muddy Lake and the surrounding landscape.
It has one of the three largest breeding concentrations of piping plovers in the Canadian Prairies.

Canada's Historic Places

Sam Kelly Sites 
In the nineteenth and early twentieth century the Badlands formed the northern end of the "Outlaw Trail", a series of trails and stopping areas utilized by outlaws in the American West spanning from Canada to Mexico. Outlaws such as Henry Borne and his brother Coyote Pete, Sam Kelly, the Pigeon Toed Kid, and the notorious Sundance Kid turned up in the area.

In 1999,  of land was set aside as the Sam Kelly Sites in the Canadian part of the badlands and put on the Canadian Register of Historic Places. The historical site contains nine archaeological sites, including stone rings and effigies, caves, and homestead remains.

Buffalo Effigy 
The Buffalo Effigy was constructed by local Indigenous people from fieldstone overlooking West Beaver Creek near the border with Montana. The 64-hectare site was formally recognized in 1999. Besides the Buffalo Effigy, there is a stone cairn and at least eight stone rings.

Minton Turtle Effigy 
The Minton Turtle Effigy is located on a hill overlooking Big Muddy Badlands and Big Muddy Lake. It was first identified by Thomas Kehoe in 1965. He believed it represented a turtle, yet others, including Indigenous elders, believe it represents a badger. The site is a protected area and is fenced off with an informative plaque describing the turtle.

Gallery

See also 
Geography of Saskatchewan
Geography of Montana
History of Saskatchewan
List of historic places in rural municipalities of Saskatchewan
List of protected areas of Saskatchewan

References

External links 
 The Minton Turtle Effigy
 

Badlands of Canada
Geography of Saskatchewan
Natural history of Saskatchewan
Landforms of Saskatchewan
Happy Valley No. 10, Saskatchewan
Canadian folklore
Important Bird Areas of Saskatchewan